Jackpine Mountain is located on the border of Alberta and British Columbia. It was named in 1913 by Mary Jobe Akeley. Jack pine timber accounts for the name.

See also
 List of peaks on the Alberta–British Columbia border
 Mountains of British Columbia

References

Two-thousanders of Alberta
Two-thousanders of British Columbia
Canadian Rockies